Toulgarctia is a genus of moths in the subfamily Arctiinae from Madagascar. The genus was erected by Vladimir Viktorovitch Dubatolov and Patrick G. Haynes in 2008.

Species 
 Toulgarctia griveaudi (Toulgoët, 1956)
 Toulgarctia luteoradians (Toulgoët, 1954)
 Toulgarctia luteoradians jugicola (Toulgoët, 1976)
 Toulgarctia luteoradians monochroma (Toulgoët, 1984)
 Toulgarctia milloti (Toulgoët, 1954)
 Toulgarctia viettei (Toulgoët, 1954)
 Toulgarctia vieui (Toulgoët, 1956)

References
 , 2008: Reviewing the African tiger-moth genera. 1. New genera from the late Prof. V. S. Murzin's collection (Lepidoptera, Arctiidae). Atalanta 39 (1/4): 356–366, 20 figs., pl. 15.

Spilosomina
Moths of Africa
Insects of Madagascar
Moth genera